Bendigo Workshops is a railway workshop located in the provincial city of Bendigo, Victoria, Australia. They are located in the north of the city beside the junction of the Piangil and Deniliquin lines. The site covers 10.3 hectares of land and has 31 separate buildings, including a 10,000 sqm main workshop building and 6 kilometres of railway track.

History
The workshops were opened in November 1917 by the main rail operator in Victoria, the Victorian Railways. They were opened in response to political pressures from provincial groups for decentralisation, with the Victorian Railways preferring the cheaper option of expanding the existing Newport Workshops in suburban Melbourne. Furthermore, unemployment had risen in both Bendigo and Ballarat due to a decline in mining operations. The main work carried out was repairs and maintenance of existing wagons and locomotives, however during 1919-22 thirteen new steam locomotives were also built - eight DD class (1033 - 1037, 1047 - 1049) and five A2 class  (1078 - 1082). 
From the 1950s onwards, numerous steam locomotives were scrapped at the workshops. During the years immediately following nominal dieselisation in 1968, they were, at times, cutting up locomotives at the rate of one every two to three weeks.

The workshops were also the site of the first VR brass foundry, which was transferred to Newport by the 1960s. Also throughout 1965 VLX louvred vans were constructed at the workshops, at a rate of one a week. Other tasks included spring manufacture, construction of stainless steel footwarmers, and assembly of pantographs for electric trains, with a staff of 720 employed during 1966. By the 1980s, refurbishment work was also being carried out on Melbourne suburban electric multiple units.

The 1980s were also a time of restructuring, and on the breakup of the Victorian Railways the workshops passed to the State Transport Authority and then the Public Transport Corporation. With privatisation the workshops were closed, with the loss of 262 jobs. The site was used to store excess rolling stock, with 12 Hitachi suburban trains being stored there and becoming heavily vandalised, until they were returned to Melbourne in 2006.

The workshops were redeveloped in 2002 at a cost of $6.5 million - $4 million from VicTrack, $2 million from the State Government Regional Infrastructure Development Fund and $500,000 by the City of Greater Bendigo. The redevelopment was officially opened in 2004, with Empire Rubber (a division of Nylex) the major tenant, producing rubber vehicle components until the company collapsed in 2007.

Since 2009, the workshops had been leased to Southern Shorthaul Railroad, who use the site for locomotive and rollingstock maintenance on behalf of Pacific National, Metro Trains Melbourne, V/Line and Rail First Asset Management.

References

Buildings and structures in Bendigo
Railway workshops in Victoria (Australia)
Bendigo